Brandon Sugden (born June 23, 1978) is a Canadian former professional ice hockey right winger. He was selected by Toronto Maple Leafs in the fifth round (111th overall) of the 1996 NHL Entry Draft. Nicknamed "Sugar" during his rookie training camp in Toronto, Sugden played 406 career games from 1998 until 2011.

Sugden retired after the 2010-11 due to post-concussion syndrome.

Personal life
Since his retirement, Sugden runs a high-profile garment embroidery business in his hometown of Toronto. Sugden lives in Barrie, Ontario with his girlfriend and works as a bartender .

References

External links

1978 births
Canadian ice hockey right wingers
Cincinnati Cyclones (IHL) players
Dayton Bombers players
Hartford Wolf Pack players
HC Vityaz players
Hershey Bears players
Ice hockey people from Toronto
Living people
Peoria Rivermen (ECHL) players
Syracuse Crunch players
Tallahassee Tiger Sharks players
Toronto Maple Leafs draft picks
Tulsa Oilers (1992–present) players
Verdun Dragons players
Worcester IceCats players
Canadian expatriate ice hockey players in Russia
Canadian expatriate ice hockey players in the United States